Manfred Pahl (born January 20, 1900, in Ebingen; died May 11, 1994, in Stuttgart) was a German painter, draftsman and graphic artist of Expressive Realism.

Early life and works 

At the beginning of the 1920s, Pahl studied at the Academy of Fine Arts Stuttgart. He illustrated the 'fairytale of the Rhine and of the people' for Georg Engelbert Graf which was published in 1925. 

In 1929, together with Manfred Henninger, Alfred Lehmann, Gustav Schopf, and Wilhelm Geyer, founded the Stuttgart New Secession.  In addition to his painting (Tanzpaar, 1951) Pahl created a comprehensive graphic work. In the 1980s he created a museum of his work, the 'Pahl Museum' in Mainhardt-Gailsbach near Schwäbisch Hall.

Personal life 
He lived in Berlin until 1947.

Honors 
 1973: Cross of Merit 1st Class of the Federal Republic of Germany
 1981: Medal of Merit of the State of Baden-Württemberg

Literature  
 Günther Wirth: Art in the German Southwest from 1945 to the Present. Hatje, Stuttgart, 1982.

References

External links 
  Pahl-Museum
  Manfred Pahl's artnet page

German male artists
Graphic artists
Modern painters
Officers Crosses of the Order of Merit of the Federal Republic of Germany
Recipients of the Order of Merit of Baden-Württemberg
1900 births
1994 deaths